The Chrysler 26 is an American trailerable sailboat that was designed by Halsey Herreshoff as a cruiser and first built in 1977.

Production
The design was built by Chrysler Marine in the United States, starting in 1977, but it is now out of production.

Design
The Chrysler 26 is a recreational keelboat, built predominantly of fiberglass. It has a masthead sloop rig, a raked stem plumb stem, a nearly-plumb transom, an internally mounted spade-type rudder controlled by a tiller and a swing keel or optional fixed fin keel.

The boat was produced with two different deck plans, the flush-deck "Cruiser" and the "Courser", named for the bird, with a more conventional coach house cabin.

The boat is normally fitted with a small outboard motor for docking and maneuvering, although a diesel inboard was a factory option.

The design has sleeping accommodation for six people, with a double "V"-berth in the bow cabin, two straight settee berths in the main cabin and an aft cabin with a double berth. The head is fully enclosed.

Variants
Chrysler 26
This model has a swing keel, displaces  and carries  of ballast.
Chrysler 26 FK
This fixed keel model displaces  and carries  of ballast.

Operational history
The boat is supported by an active class club the Chrysler Sailors and at one time also the Chrysler Sailing Association.

In a review SailRite wrote, "the Chrysler 26 is an excellent cruiser and features sleeping for six, with forward v-berth, double stern berth and two side berths. The Chrysler 26 also has an enclosed head for privacy. With six side windows and a translucent forward hatch there is plenty of ambient light."

See also
List of sailing boat types

References

External links

Photo of the Chrysler 26 "Cruiser" version

Keelboats
1970s sailboat type designs
Sailing yachts
Trailer sailers
Sailboat type designs by Halsey Herreshoff
Sailboat types built by Chrysler Marine